Thierry Lazaro (born September 27, 1960) was a member of the National Assembly of France.  He represented Nord's 6th constituency from 1993 to 2017, as a member of the Union for a Popular Movement.

References

1960 births
Living people
Union for a Popular Movement politicians
Deputies of the 10th National Assembly of the French Fifth Republic
Deputies of the 11th National Assembly of the French Fifth Republic
Deputies of the 12th National Assembly of the French Fifth Republic
Deputies of the 13th National Assembly of the French Fifth Republic
Deputies of the 14th National Assembly of the French Fifth Republic